Sesto Rondò is a station on Line 1 of the Milan Metro. The station was opened on 28 September 1986 as part of the extension from Sesto Marelli to Sesto 1º Maggio.

The station is located in the municipality of Sesto San Giovanni, in the metropolitan territory of Milan.

This is an underground station with two tracks in a single tunnel.

References

Line 1 (Milan Metro) stations
Railway stations opened in 1986
1986 establishments in Italy
Railway stations in Italy opened in the 20th century